Riverrun is the musical project by the British electronic music group Underworld, released between  and , exclusively on the band's official website, as a series of three internet-only EPs, and as limited 12" vinyl releases.

Background 
While touring the album A Hundred Days Off in 2003 through Australia and the Middle East, and nearing the end of the record contract, Hyde and Smith decided to take a more independent approach to recording and releasing music. Excited by the idea of the long tail effect described in a Wired article and the writings of Robert Fripp, the band decided on going fully independent and releasing music through online distribution, free downloads, and live broadcasts, an idea the band had talked about for over 20 years. The band had already gotten into a habit of publishing content online in 2000 - including archive music, photos, and diary entries - as an online extension to the Everything Everything DVD. The band received responses to their first post "within hours" which Hyde later described as "an incredibly empowering moment, when we realized that there [are] more than the traditional ways of communicating."

The band described the project as "an occasional series 'straight from the mixing desk' and [the three releases] are comprised from the 'work-in-progress' at that moment in time." "The riverrun is our name not only for the flow of the jam but also for that part of the process where 'one thing flows into another.'" Each digital EP was a download-only package in a .zip file containing a single 192 kbit/s encoded .mp3 file with all tracks mixed together, as well as a QuickTime slide-show of black-and-white photographs set to ambient sounds, and a PDF file of the CD insert.

More than 200 tracks of newly recorded material proved hard to contain, so Hyde and Smith asked for the opinions of DJ and production friends including Pete Heller, James Holden, Darren Price, the Junior Boy's Own head Steven Hall, and Sven Väth. Some of the tracks were chosen for soundtracks, 2006's Breaking and Entering and 2008's Sunshine, as well as the band's next full-length 2007 album Oblivion with Bells. Others ultimately became part of the Riverrun Project. Hyde and Smith decided to manage the series online, with the help of John Warwicker (the former member of Underworld's precursor band Freur) and the band's own graphic-arts company Tomato.

Concurrent with the Riverrun releases, the band began a series of web radio shows broadcast through Apple Quicktime between 2004 and 2008, which they described as "part of the 'Riverrun' series". During these webcasts, Underworld answered questions from a live chat, and broadcast live performances and new unreleased music alongside other selections from their favorite artists.

Speaking in 2007, Hyde described their "multi-stranded" method of releasing music online as "more natural than always having to work the traditional way, which can be very cumbersome, and very constraining when you always have to put music out as a physical and scheduled product." However, in 2019, Hyde admitted that "most of it felt unfinished. It came out before it’d reached a place that certainly [Rick Smith] was happy with. [The songs on Riverrun] were rough sketches of ideas that were assembled in a way that was attractive, but they were still rough. They still had a journey to go on."

The digital EPs 
The download-only package was "made up of seven new tracks that fuse into a single, undulating work." It also included a gallery of selected 177 black-and-white photographs by Karl Hyde, and a PDF file with a front cover artwork for a CD insert.

The package includes a gallery of selected 444 photographs by Karl Hyde.

It "explores a darker, moodier side to Underworld", with the audio section being made from 5 new tracks jammed together to form a single work. The 53-images gallery is a slide show with audio with images gathered by Karl in Tokyo in November 2005, and curated by John."

Singles 

A series of five limited edition 12-inch records, which included remixes of "JAL to Tokyo", "Play Pig", "Peggy Sussed", and "Vanilla Monkey" by Pete Heller, Buick Project, Pig & Dan, Wighnomy, Paul Woolford, and Martinez were released in 2006 at the end of the project. Digital singles were also released through iTunes and underworldlive.com.

A "JAL to Tokyo" single was also released exclusively to iTunes Store Japan, with an extended version of "Ancient Phat Farm Coat" and an unmixed version of "Food a Ready" as b-sides.

Drift
Underworld would return to the idea of internet-only releases in 2018, with the experimental year-long music-and-video project Drift. After the completion of Drift series 1, Karl explained "The Drift series has taken inspiration from [Riverrun] in that [the songs] been carried to a much higher level of completion." The song "S T A R" from Drift re-uses the percussion loops from "Lenne Penne".

Track listing 
Originally delivered as single audio files titled "Audio.mp3." The track times listed are estimated.

Lovely Broken Thing

Pizza for Eggs

I'm a Big Sister, and I'm a Girl, and I'm a Princess, and This Is My Horse

References 

Underworld (band) albums